Hall Family House is a historic home and farm located near Bear Poplar, Rowan County, North Carolina.  The farmhouse was built in 1856–1857, and is a two-story, three bay, "L"-plan Greek Revival style frame dwelling.  It has a full width front porch and two-story rear ell. Its builder James Graham also built the Jacob Barber House and the Robert Knox House. Also on the property are the contributing triple-pen log barn, log smokehouse, water tank, milking parlor, and barn (1925).

It was listed on the National Register of Historic Places in 1982.

References

Houses on the National Register of Historic Places in North Carolina
Greek Revival houses in North Carolina
Houses completed in 1856
Houses in Rowan County, North Carolina
National Register of Historic Places in Rowan County, North Carolina